A family tree, also called a genealogy or a pedigree chart, is a chart representing family relationships in a conventional tree structure. More detailed family trees, used in medicine and social work, are known as genograms.

Representations of family history 
Family trees are often presented with the oldest generations at the top of the tree and the younger generations at the bottom. An ancestry chart, which is a tree showing the ancestors of an individual and not all members of a family, will more closely resemble a tree in shape, being wider at the top than at the bottom. In some ancestry charts, an individual appears on the left and his or her ancestors appear to the right. Conversely, a descendant chart, which depicts all the descendants of an individual, will be narrowest at the top. Beyond these formats, some family trees might include all members of a particular surname (e.g., male-line descendants). Yet another approach is to include all holders of a certain office, such as the Kings of Germany, which represents the reliance on marriage to link dynasties together.

The passage of time can also be included to illustrate ancestry and descent. A time scale is often used, expanding radially across the center, divided into decades.  Children of the parent form branches around the center and their names are plotted in their birth year on the time scale. Spouses' names join children's names and nuclear families of parents and children branch off to grandchildren, and so on. Great-grandparents are often in the center to portray four or five generations, which reflect the natural growth pattern of a tree as seen from the top. In a descendant tree, living relatives are common on the outer branches and contemporary cousins appear adjacent to each other. Privacy should be considered when preparing a living family tree.

The image of the tree probably originated with that of the Tree of Jesse in medieval art, used to illustrate the Genealogy of Christ in terms of a prophecy of Isaiah (Isaiah 11:1). Possibly the first non-biblical use, and the first to show full family relationships rather than a purely patrilineal scheme, was that involving family trees of the classical gods in Boccaccio's Genealogia Deorum Gentilium ("On the Genealogy of the Gods of the Gentiles"), whose first version dates to 1360.

Common formats 
In addition to familiar representations of family history and genealogy as a tree structure, there are other notable systems used to illustrate and document ancestry and descent.

Ahnentafel 

An Ahnentafel (German for "ancestor table") is a genealogical numbering system for listing a person's direct ancestors in a fixed sequence of ascent:
 Subject (or proband)
 Father
 Mother
 Paternal grandfather
 Paternal grandmother
 Maternal grandfather
 Maternal grandmother
and so on, back through the generations. Apart from the subject or proband, who can be male or female, all even-numbered persons are male, and all odd-numbered persons are female. In this scheme, the number of any person's father is double the person's number, and a person's mother is double the person's number plus one. This system can also be displayed as a tree:

Fan chart 

A fan chart features a half circle chart with concentric rings: the subject is the inner circle, the second circle is divided in two (each side is one parent), the third circle is divided in four, and so forth. Fan charts depict paternal and maternal ancestors.

Graph theory 
While family trees are depicted as trees, family relations do not in general form a tree in the strict sense used in graph theory, since distant relatives can mate. Therefore, a person can have a common ancestor on both their mother's and father's side. However, because a parent must be born before their child, an individual cannot be their own ancestor, and thus there are no loops. In this regard, ancestry forms a directed acyclic graph. Nevertheless, graphs depicting matrilineal descent (mother-daughter relationships) and patrilineal descent (father-son relationships) do form trees. Assuming no common ancestor, an ancestry chart is a perfect binary tree, as each person has exactly one mother and one father; these thus have a regular structure. A Descendant chart, on the other hand, does not, in general, have a regular structure, as a person can have any number of children or none at all.

Notable examples 

Family trees have been used to document family histories across time and cultures throughout the world.

Africa 
In Africa, the ruling dynasty of Ethiopia claimed descent from King Solomon via the Queen of Sheba. Through this claim, the family traced their descent back to the House of David.

The genealogy of Ancient Egyptian ruling dynasties was recorded from the beginnings of the Pharaonic era circa 3000 BC to the end of the Ptolomaic Kingdom; although this is not a record of one continuously-linked family lineage, and surviving records are incomplete.

Elsewhere in Africa, oral traditions of genealogical recording predominate. Members of the Keita dynasty of Mali, for example, have had their pedigrees sung by griots during annual ceremonies since the 14th century. Meanwhile, in Nigeria, many ruling clans—most notably those descended from Oduduwa—claim descent from the legendary King Kisra. Here too, pedigrees are recited by griots attached to the royal courts.

The Americas 
In some pre-contact Native American civilizations, genealogical records of ruling and priestly families were kept, some of which extended over several centuries or longer.

East Asia 
There are extensive genealogies for the ruling dynasties of China, but these do not form a single, unified family tree. Additionally, it is unclear at which point(s) the most ancient historical figures named become mythological.

In Japan, the ancestry of the Imperial Family is traced back to the mythological origins of Japan. The connection to persons from the established historical record only begins in the mid-first millennium AD.

The longest family tree in the world is that of the Chinese philosopher and educator Confucius (551–479 BC), who is descended from King Tang (1675–1646 BC). The tree spans more than 80 generations from him and includes more than 2 million members. An international effort involving more than 450 branches around the world was started in 1998 to retrace and revise this family tree. A new edition of the Confucius genealogy was printed in September 2009 by the Confucius Genealogy Compilation Committee, to coincide with the 2560th anniversary of the birth of the Chinese thinker. This latest edition was expected to include some 1.3 million living members who are scattered around the world today.

Europe and West Asia 
Before the Dark Ages, in the Greco-Roman world, some reliable pedigrees dated back perhaps at least as far as the first half of the first millennium BC; with claimed or mythological origins reaching back further. Roman clan and family lineages played an important part in the structure of their society and were the basis of their intricate system of personal names. However, there was a break in the continuity of record-keeping at the end of Classical Antiquity. Records of the lines of succession of the Popes and the Eastern Roman Emperors through this transitional period have survived, but these are not continuous genealogical histories of single families. Refer to descent from antiquity.

Many noble and aristocratic families of European and West Asian origin can reliably trace their ancestry back as far as the mid to late first millennium AD; some claiming undocumented descent from Classical Antiquity or mythological ancestors. In Europe, for example, the pedigree of Niall Noígíallach would be a contender for the longest, through Conn of the Hundred Battles (fl. 123 AD); in the legendary history of Ireland, he is further descended from Breogán, and ultimately from Adam, through the sons of Noah.

Another very old and extensive tree is that of the Lurie lineage—which includes Sigmund Freud and Martin Buber—and traces back to Lurie, a 13th-century rabbi in Brest-Litovsk, and from there to Rashi and purportedly back to the legendary King David, as documented by Neil Rosenstein in his book The Lurie Legacy. The 1999 edition of the Guinness Book of Records recorded the Lurie family in the "longest lineage" category as one of the oldest-known living families in the world today.

Family trees and representations of lineages are also important in religious traditions. The biblical genealogies of Jesus also claim descent from the House of David, covering a period of approximately 1000 years. In the Torah and Old Testament, genealogies are provided for many biblical persons, including a record of the descendants of Adam. Also according to the Torah, the Kohanim are descended from Aaron. Genetic testing performed at the Technion has shown that most modern Kohanim share common Y-chromosome origins, although there is no complete family tree of the Kohanim. In the Islamic world, claimed descent from the prophet Muhammad greatly enhanced the status of political and religious leaders; new dynasties often used claims of such descent to help establish their legitimacy.

Elsewhere 
Elsewhere, in many human cultures, clan and tribal associations are based on claims of common ancestry, although detailed documentation of those origins is often very limited.

Global 
Forms of family trees are also used in genetic genealogy.

Other uses 
The author Pete Frame is notable for having produced "family trees" of rock bands. In this instance, the entries represent a membership of certain groups, and personnel changes within them, rather than family relationships. Several books have been produced with his family trees, which in turn have led to a BBC television series about them, including interviews from the bands depicted in the trees.

Another common use is in the creation of episcopal trees in Christian traditions that believe in apostolic succession. In this case, the connection is not made through blood, but through the order of succession of bishops.

See also 
 GEDCOM
 Genealogical numbering systems
 Genealogy software
 Genogram
 List of family trees
 Pedigree chart
 Tree of life (biology)
 WikiTree

References

External links 

 
Genealogy
Charts